In enzymology, a rhamnulokinase is an enzyme that catalyzes the chemical reaction

ATP + L-rhamnulose  ADP + L-rhamnulose 1-phosphate

Thus, the two substrates of this enzyme are ATP and L-rhamnulose, whereas its two products are ADP and L-rhamnulose 1-phosphate.

This enzyme belongs to the family of transferases, specifically those transferring phosphorus-containing groups (phosphotransferases) with an alcohol group as acceptor.  The systematic name of this enzyme class is ATP:L-rhamnulose 1-phosphotransferase. Other names in common use include RhuK, rhamnulokinase (phosphorylating), L-rhamnulokinase, L-rhamnulose kinase, and rhamnulose kinase.  This enzyme participates in pentose and glucuronate interconversions and fructose and mannose metabolism. This enzyme can catalyze the xylulose phosphorilation:

ATP + L-Xylulose  ADP + L-Xylulose 1-phosphate

Structural studies

References 

 
 D.Grueninger and G.E.Schulz (2006). Structure and reaction mechanism of L-rhamnulose kinase from Escherichia coli.. J. Mol. Biol., 359, 787-797.
 D.Grueninger and G.E.Schulz (2007). Substrate spectrum of L-rhamnulose kinase related to models derived from two ternary complex structures.. FEBS Lett, 581, 3127-3130.

EC 2.7.1
Enzymes of known structure